The Fall of Otrar (Otyrardyñ küirewi) is a 1991 Kazakhstani drama film directed by Ardak Amirkulov. The film was selected as the Kazakhstani entry for the Best Foreign Language Film at the 65th Academy Awards, but was not accepted as a nominee.

Cast
 Dokhdurbek Kydyraliyev as Undzhu (as Dokha Kydyraliyev)
 Tungyshpai Zhamankulov as Kaiyrkhan (as Tungyshbai Dzhamankulov)
 Bolot Beyshenaliev as Shinvyskhan
 Abdurashid Makhsudov as Mukhamedshakh
 Zaur Zekhov as Yalbach (as Zauirbii Zekhov)
 Kasym Zhakibayev as Dinnen Bezeyen

See also
 List of submissions to the 65th Academy Awards for Best Foreign Language Film
 List of Kazakhstani submissions for the Academy Award for Best Foreign Language Film

References

External links
 

1991 films
1991 drama films
Kazakh-language films
1990s Mandarin-language films
Mongolian-language films
Kazakhstani drama films
1991 multilingual films
Kazakhstani multilingual films